Nils Axelsson (18 January 1906 – 18 January 1989) was a Swedish football defender who played for Sweden in the 1934 FIFA World Cup. He also played for Helsingborgs IF.

References

External links

1906 births
1989 deaths
Swedish footballers
Sweden international footballers
Association football defenders
Helsingborgs IF players
1934 FIFA World Cup players